Cristiane Parmigiano (born 16 May 1979) is a Brazilian judoka. She competed in the women's half-middleweight event at the 1996 Summer Olympics.

References

1979 births
Living people
Brazilian female judoka
Olympic judoka of Brazil
Judoka at the 1996 Summer Olympics
Place of birth missing (living people)
South American Games gold medalists for Brazil
South American Games medalists in judo
Competitors at the 2002 South American Games